Ganapathichettikulam is a small village near Pondicherry on the south eastern coast of India. The main occupation is fishing. Ganapathichettikulam has several temples, most notably Lord Ganapathi's temple, Goddess Kangeyammman's temple and Goddess Kamalakanniamman Temple.

Education
The Pondicherry Institute of Medical Sciences is located there.

Villages in Puducherry district